Hobbycraft is an arts and crafts superstore retail chain in the United Kingdom. It is currently owned by investment group Bridgepoint.

History

It was started by the Haskins Group, a nursery and garden supplier in the south of England, and was bought by investment group Bridgepoint in April 2010.

The stores have been blamed for putting independent craft suppliers out of business, and the amount of choice for specific hobbies has been said to be not as good as in specialised stores. Hobbycraft reported a 10% increase in sales in the beginning of 2010, and opened two new stores, with the chief executive saying arts and crafts are a low cost hobby and he believed they would do well despite difficulties in the economy.

In 2010 to 2011, Hobbycraft quickly brought in a new shipping system under the guidance of Hobbycraft IT Director Mike Thomas, a former supply chain director, IT and Business Development Director for the defunct Entertainment UK and Woolworths Group companies in which he had held active senior director/shareholder roles.

During the deployment of the new IT system, Hobbycraft management also decided to relocate the distribution centre operations from Blandford Forum to Burton-upon-Trent. In October 2013, it was revealed that "Hobbycraft's pre-tax profits fell from £11.5m to £6.3m last year after the company incurred exceptional costs of £2.8m, mostly as a result of the decision to relocate its distribution from Dorset to Staffordshire."

In September 2014, it was revealed that Hobbycraft's profits had halved, due to chains such as Aldi, Lidl, Poundland, and online retailers such as Amazon moving into the craft market. Hobbycraft's CEO Catriona Marshall said that the company's profits had been depressed by a £3m investment on a rented warehouse in Burton-upon-Trent, on which Hobbycraft took out a fifteen-year lease.

Marshall said: "Our performance in 2013/14 reflects investment in infrastructure and the final stages of the programme to put in place our new supply chain and online trading platform. We are now using this investment to grow store sales and our online presence."

At the start of December 2014, Bridgepoint brought in retail veteran Archie Norman in the hope of turning around the fortunes of the company.

In May 2018, Matt Davies, the new chairman, added: "This is a unique business that I have followed for many years. I look forward to working with Dominic again and to working with the team to build on its success to make Hobbycraft an even greater place for crafters and enthusiasts alike."

In August 2020, Hobbycraft announced multi-channel growth plans after a complete financial year in which its online revenues increased by 19%. The company has seen e-commerce turbocharged this year – recording a 200% rise in internet revenues as the 12-week shutdown of Covid-19 channelled much of its web revenue.

In May 2021, Hobbycraft was revealed as the Fourth Best Big Company to Work for in the UK and the third Best Retail Company to work for in the UK by the Best Companies Awards 2021.

Past logo

Controversies
 In May 2013, Queen's Hospital A&E department in Burton upon Trent was closed down for three hours "in accordance with national guidance" after seven workers of Hobbycraft attended A&E and reported being covered with an unknown white powder. It was later shown to be inert.
 In September 2014, Hobbycraft made wide news headlines in the United Kingdom when non-national staff were required to speak English at work or face disciplinary action.

References

External links
 hobbycraft.co.uk — official website

Arts and crafts retailers
Companies based in Dorset
Retail companies of the United Kingdom
Stationers of the United Kingdom
Retail companies established in 1995
British companies established in 1995